iF-22, mislabeled as iF-22 Raptor, is a video game developed by American studio Magic Labs and published by Interactive Magic for Windows. The game was first released in 1997.

Reception

The game received average reviews. Next Generation said of the game, "There's a lot here for the casual pilot, and something for the flight fan, but for the hard-core sim purist, it's just not anything to shout about."

See also
iF-16
iF/A-18E Carrier Strike Fighter

References

External links
 

1997 video games
Combat flight simulators
Video games developed in the United States
Windows games
Windows-only games